Kim Victoria Fields-Morgan ( Fields, formerly Freeman; born May 12, 1969) is an American actress and director. Fields is best known for her roles as Dorothy "Tootie" Ramsey on the NBC sitcom The Facts of Life (1979–1988), and as Regine Hunter on the Fox sitcom Living Single (1993–1998). She currently stars in the Netflix original series The Upshaws.

Early life
 
Fields is the daughter of actress/director Chip Fields-Hurd, and the older sister of actress Alexis Fields, best known for her roles on Kenan & Kel, Moesha and Sister, Sister as well as Roc.

Career
Before appearing on The Facts of Life, Fields co-starred in a short-lived sitcom called Baby, I'm Back with Demond Wilson and Denise Nicholas, and she appeared in a television commercial for Mrs. Butterworth's syrup. She later appeared on two episodes of Good Times as a friend of Penny Gordon Woods, played by Janet Jackson. Fields' episodes on Good Times were "The Snow Storm" and "The Physical".

Fields played the role of Dorothy "Tootie" Ramsey on the NBC sitcom The Facts of Life from 1979 to 1988. Even years later, many still recognize her catchphrase, "We're in troouu-ble!". When the show began production, Fields was so short that the producers put her on roller skates during the first season so that they could avoid difficult camera angles. However, she later lost a role as Arnold Jackson's girlfriend on The Facts of Lifes parent show Diff'rent Strokes because she was taller than Gary Coleman, who played Arnold. In 1984, during the run of The Facts of Life, Fields released two singles on the Critique Records label: the disco/Hi-NRG "He Loves Me He Loves Me Not" (which became a minor club hit), and "Dear Michael" (which became a minor R&B hit, reaching No. 50).

After taking time away from acting to attend Pepperdine University. Fields also appeared in a 1993 episode of The Fresh Prince of Bel-Air, in which Will Smith pretended to marry her in an attempt to seduce her. Fields had a starring role in the hit Fox sitcom Living Single from 1993 to 1998 as Regina "Reginé" Hunter.

After the cancellation of Living Single, Fields began performing rap music and R&B with a group called Impromp 2. With her degree from Pepperdine University, Fields began directing. Fields directed a number of episodes of the All That! spin-off Kenan & Kel, in which she also appeared in two episodes. She has worked as a director on the sitcoms Tyler Perry's Meet the Browns, Tyler Perry's House of Payne and BET's Let's Stay Together.

Fields guest-starred on television shows such as UPN's One on One, The Golden Palace, and appeared as herself on HBO's The Comeback. On February 1, 2007, Fields was reunited with her co-star Lisa Whelchel on WFAA-TV's Good Morning Texas. Fields was in Dallas to promote her appearance in the production Issues: We've All Got 'Em when Whelchel was introduced as a surprise guest. It marked the first time in six years (since The Facts of Life Reunion movie) that Fields and Whelchel had seen each other.

Fields has worked with her husband Christopher Morgan on projects. In 2010, she and Christopher produced and directed a Christmas television special called Holiday Love. They shot the entire show in three days. Holiday Love aired on TV One and a second episode aired for Christmas, 2011. In an interview that included background on the show, Fields described the Christmas special as "restorative and transformative" of her Christian faith. Fields revived Holiday Love on the Internet in 2013.

On August 18, 2015, it was announced that she would be joining the cast of Bravo reality television show The Real Housewives of Atlanta for its eighth season. On March 21, 2016, she announced that she would not return to the show for another season. 

On March 8, 2016, Fields was announced as one of the celebrities who will compete on season 22 of Dancing with the Stars. She was partnered with professional dancer Sasha Farber. On May 2, 2016, during a double elimination, Fields and Farber were eliminated and finished the competition in 8th place.

In 2017, Fields played the role of Theresa Newman in the Christian film A Question of Faith. The movie featured Fields' first co-starring appearance in a feature film and premiered in theaters on September 29, 2017.

Currently, Fields stars on Netflix's The Upshaws.

Personal life 
Fields was married to film producer Johnathon Franklin Freeman from 1995 to 2001. Fields gave birth to her first child, Sebastian Alexander Morgan, by then-boyfriend, Broadway actor Christopher Morgan. The couple introduced their son the following week in People magazine. On July 23, 2007, they were married in a private ceremony officiated by Pastor Donnie McClurkin. On July 24, 2013, she announced on the talk show, The Real, that she and her husband were expecting another child, a boy. The couple welcomed their second son, Quincy Morgan, in Atlanta, Georgia.

Filmography

Film

Television

Directing

References

External links

20th-century American actresses
21st-century American actresses
Actresses from New York City
African-American actresses
African-American television directors
American actors of Jamaican descent
American child actresses
American television actresses
American television directors
American women television directors
Living people
Pepperdine University alumni
The Real Housewives cast members
The Real Housewives of Atlanta
20th-century African-American women
20th-century African-American people
21st-century African-American women
21st-century African-American people
1969 births